Halhal in Iran, may refer to:
 Halhal-e Olya
 Halhal-e Sofla